Kathleen Marie Hobbs (born December 28, 1969) is an American politician and social worker serving as the 24th governor of Arizona since 2023. She previously served as the 21st secretary of state of Arizona from 2019 to 2023. A member of the Democratic Party, Hobbs served in the Arizona Senate from 2013 to 2019 and in the Arizona House of Representatives from 2011 to 2013.

Born and raised in Arizona, Hobbs holds degrees in social work from Northern Arizona University and Arizona State University. She specialized in domestic violence and worked for one of the nation's largest domestic violence centers. Inspired to run for office by her involvement with Emerge Arizona, Hobbs was elected to the Arizona House of Representatives in 2010 and to the Arizona Senate in 2012. She served as Senate minority leader from 2015 to 2019 and was elected secretary of state of Arizona in 2018.

Hobbs won the 2022 Arizona gubernatorial election, defeating Republican nominee Kari Lake. She became Arizona's fifth female governor on January 2, 2023.

Early life, education, and career
Hobbs was born in Tempe, Arizona. She has a twin sister, Becky. A first-generation Arizonan, Hobbs was raised in Tempe in a middle-class family that sometimes relied on food stamps. She comes from a Catholic family and volunteered at her church as a child. She went to Catholic schools throughout her childhood and graduated from Seton Catholic High School in 1988.

Hobbs attended Northern Arizona University, where she received a bachelor's degree in social work in 1992. She later attended Arizona State University, where she received a master's degree in social work in 1995. She paid for college through scholarships and work-study programs.

Social worker 
Hobbs has been a social worker since 1992. She specializes in domestic violence, mental health, and homelessness.

Hobbs was the chief compliance officer for Sojourner Center, one of the nation's largest domestic violence centers. She is an adjunct faculty member of social work at Paradise Valley Community College and Arizona State University.

Hobbs is affiliated with the National Association of Social Workers professional organization.

Early political career 
Before seeking elected office, Hobbs participated in political leadership programs in multiple organizations, including Valley Leadership, Emerge Arizona, and the Center for Progressive Leadership. She was a delegate for Hillary Clinton at the 2008 Democratic National Convention.

Hobbs served on the Phoenix Women's Commission and the Phoenix Human Services Commission.

Hobbs was the executive director of Emerge Arizona from 2013 to 2019.

Arizona House of Representatives 

Hobbs was elected to the Arizona House of Representatives in 2010. She represented the 15th legislative district alongside Lela Alston.

Hobbs credited her interest in politics to her involvement with Emerge Arizona and was inspired to run for office by the people she assisted as a social worker, believing they were not being heard by the government. She advocates ending domestic violence.

Hobbs served one term in the House of Representatives and ran for state senate in 2012.

Arizona Senate 
Hobbs was elected to the Arizona Senate in 2012 and reelected in 2016. She represented the 24th legislative district. She originally did not want to run for state senate but did so due to redistricting. Hobbs became minority leader in 2015 and served two terms in that position.

In 2015, during her first term as minority leader, Senate staffer Talonya Adams, a Black woman, complained to Hobbs about her concerns about racial and gender-based discrimination and was later fired in part by Hobbs. In November 2021, Adams won a discrimination lawsuit related to her firing and was awarded a judgment of $2.75 million.

Hobbs resigned her seat in the State Senate on January 7, 2019, after being elected secretary of state. She was succeeded by Alston.

Secretary of State of Arizona

2018 election 

On March 8, 2017, Hobbs announced her candidacy for Arizona secretary of state. In the 2018 election, she faced Republican nominee Steve Gaynor. On November 6, 2018, the Associated Press prematurely called the race for Gaynor. With the race as close as it was, neither Hobbs nor Gaynor initially claimed victory. In the days to come, Gaynor's lead narrowed as more and more ballots were counted. On November 16, Hobbs was officially declared the winner by a margin of 20,000 votes. She was the first Democrat to hold the post since Richard Mahoney left office in 1995.

Tenure 
Hobbs was sworn in as secretary of state on January 7, 2019. Because Arizona has no lieutenant governor, Hobbs stood first in the line of succession to Governor Doug Ducey.

2020 Arizona election audit 

In 2021, the Arizona Senate Republicans provided $150,000 to fund an audit aimed at contesting the 2020 presidential election results in Maricopa County. In a six-page letter, Hobbs wrote that the audit's chain of custody was lacking, calling it "a significant departure from standard best practices." She added that the audit procedures appeared "better suited for chasing conspiracy theories than as a part of a professional audit". In response, Hobbs received death threats, and the Arizona Department of Public Safety assigned personnel to guard her and her staff.

Hobbs's complaints were echoed in a letter to the State Senate president Karen Fann from the Maricopa County Board of Supervisors, which had a 4-1 Republican majority. Fann, referring to one of Donald Trump's claims of election fraud, contended that the county had deleted an entire database. The board of supervisors responded in a letter calling the accusations "false, defamatory, and beneath the dignity of the Senate." It accused the Arizona Senate of "conspiracy theories that fuel the fundraising schemes of those pulling your strings." Fann responded that the audit would continue when the Arizona Veterans Memorial Coliseum site was next available.

After consulting with the Department of Homeland Security and the Election Assistance Commission, Hobbs said she was told that it was impossible to know whether the voting machines the county turned over in response to the Senate subpoena had been compromised and that Dominion Voting Systems should re-certify them for future use. While the Arizona Senate's contractor was in possession of the machines that had been subpoenaed, the county spent over $20,000 to lease other machines in order to conduct two local elections, and the costs of re-certifying the surrendered machines after their return would be in the six-figure range; however, the Senate signed an agreement with the county that said the county is not liable for any damages to the equipment while in the Senate's custody, so it is unclear whether the county would be liable for the costs.

The audit was conducted by Florida-based company Cyber Ninjas, which had no previous experience in election audits and had not been certified by the federal government to conduct election audits. Cyber Ninjas' owner, Doug Logan, supported Trump and promoted Trump's claims of election fraud. The auditors released a report in September 2021, finding no proof of fraud and that their ballot recount increased Biden's margin of victory by 360 votes.

Governor of Arizona

2022 election

On June 2, 2021, Hobbs announced her candidacy for governor of Arizona in the 2022 election to replace term-limited Republican governor Doug Ducey.

Hobbs ran against former Customs and Border Protection chief of staff Marco Lopez and former state representative Aaron Lieberman in the Democratic primary. Despite declining to debate her opponents, she won the Democratic nomination with 72.3% of the vote.

Hobbs faced the Republican nominee, former KSAZ-TV news anchor Kari Lake, in the general election. Hobbs limited access to reporters, sometimes going out of her way to avoid them, and held small-scale campaign events. She declined to debate Lake, saying she wanted to deny Lake the opportunity to spread election denialism. Hobbs narrowly defeated Lake with 50.3% of the vote. After the election, Lake refused to concede, and was reported to be assembling a legal team to contest the election results.

Tenure 
Hobbs was sworn in on January 2, 2023, in a private ceremony, with a public ceremony scheduled for January 5. Upon taking office, she became Arizona's fifth female governor, a record for U.S. states. She has pledged to remove the illegal border wall made of shipping containers that is being built in the Coronado National Forest without authorization from the United States Forest Service. In December 2022, she selected Allie Bones, the Arizona assistant secretary of state, as her chief of staff.

Personal life
Hobbs is married to Patrick Goodman, whom she met at church in 1992 and married in 1996. Goodman is a child therapist at Phoenix Children's Hospital. They have two children and live in Phoenix.

Hobbs is Catholic. She is a triathlete and has been an avid cyclist since high school.

References

External links

 Governor Katie Hobbs official government website 
 Katie Hobbs for Governor campaign website
 

|-

|-

|-

|-

|-

|-

|-

 

 

1969 births
21st-century American politicians
21st-century American women politicians
Democratic Party Arizona state senators
ASU College of Public Service & Community Solutions alumni
Catholics from Arizona
Democratic Party governors of Arizona
Living people
Democratic Party members of the Arizona House of Representatives
Northern Arizona University alumni
People from Evanston, Illinois
Politicians from Phoenix, Arizona
Secretaries of State of Arizona
Women state constitutional officers of Arizona
Women state governors of the United States
Women state legislators in Arizona
Year of birth missing (living people)